Bruno Valente (born 30 December 1982) is a Portuguese footballer. He plays for FC Fribourg. He spent his whole career in Switzerland.

External links
 
Football.ch profile

1982 births
Living people
Portuguese footballers
Portuguese expatriate footballers
Neuchâtel Xamax FCS players
FC Lugano players
FC St. Gallen players
FC Schaffhausen players
FC La Chaux-de-Fonds players
Swiss Super League players
Swiss Challenge League players
Expatriate footballers in Switzerland
Portuguese expatriate sportspeople in Switzerland
Association football forwards
FC Meyrin players
FC Fribourg players